The perforating cutaneous nerve is a cutaneous nerve that supplies skin over the gluteus maximus muscle.

Structure
The perforating cutaneous nerve arises from the ventral rami of sacral spinal nerve 2 and sacral spinel nerve 3 of the sacral plexus. It pierces the lower part of the sacrotuberous ligament. It winds around the inferior border of the gluteus maximus muscle.

Variation 
The perforating cutaneous nerve may arise from the pudendal nerve. It may be absent. It is estimated to be absent in up to a third of people. It may be replaced by a branch from the posterior cutaneous nerve of thigh. It may also be replaced by a branch from the third and fourth, or fourth and fifth, sacral nerves.

The perforating cutaneous may pass around the sacrotuberous ligament (beneath gluteus maximus muscle) rather than piercing it.

Function 
The perforating cutaneous nerve supplies the skin covering the medial and lower parts of gluteus maximus.

See also
 Sacral plexus

References

External links

Nerves of the lower limb and lower torso